Her Majesty, Love is a 1931 American pre-Code  musical comedy drama film directed by William Dieterle for First National Pictures, starring Broadway stars Marilyn Miller and Ben Lyon, and in his talking feature debut, W. C. Fields.

It is a remake of the German film Her Majesty the Barmaid (1931).

Cast

Preservation status
Prints of Her Majesty, Love are held in the Turner Library and the Library of Congress.

References

External links

1931 films
First National Pictures films
Warner Bros. films
Films directed by William Dieterle
Films set in Berlin
American remakes of German films
American musical comedy-drama films
1930s musical comedy-drama films
American black-and-white films
1931 comedy films
1930s American films